Events from the year 2019 in Pakistan.

Incumbents 
 President: Arif Alvi
 Prime Minister: Imran Khan
 Chief Justice: Justice Gulzar Ahmed
 Speaker of the National Assembly: asad
 Chief Election Commissioner: Sardar Muhammad Raza Khan

Governors 
 Governor of Balochistan: Amanullah Khan Yasinzai
 Governor of Gilgit-Baltistan: Raja Jalal Hussain Maqpoon 
 Governor of Khyber Pakhtunkhwa: Shah Farman 
 Governor of Punjab: Muhammad Sarwar 
 Governor of Sindh: Imran Ismail

Events  

 Sindh HIV outbreak
 Dengue outbreak
 Terrorist incidents
 Karachi floods
 India border skirmishes
 19 January – Sahiwal killings
 21 January – Hub accident
 1 February – 2019 Pakistan floods and storms
 27 February – Jammu and Kashmir airstrikes
 11 July – Sadiqabad Railway Accident
 20 July – Khyber Pakhtunkhwa provincial election
 30 July – Army military plane crash
 24 September – Pakistan earthquake
 31 October – Train fire
 12 October – Pakistan at the 2019 World Beach Games
 18 October – Pakistan at the 2019 Military World Games
 October - November – Azadi March
  11 December Attack on Punjab Institute of Cardiology, Lahore.
 10 December - Pakistan at the 2019 South Asian Games
 17 December - Supreme Court give death sentence verdict on Gen RT. Pervez Musharraf.

Arts

Cinema

Economy
 2018–19 Pakistan federal budget
 2019–20 Pakistan federal budget

Sport

Cricket
Domestic
 2019 Pakistan Super League
 2019–20 Quaid-e-Azam Trophy
 2019 Pakistan Cup

International
 Sri Lankan cricket team in Pakistan 2019–20
 Bangladesh women's cricket team in Pakistan in 2019–20

Tournaments

Deaths

January
January 4 -
Syed Zulfiqar Bokhari, Pakistani diplomat and former Chairman of the Pakistan Cricket Board
Hakmeen Khan, Pakistani politician.
January 11 - Khalida Hussain, Pakistani fiction writer (b. 1937).
January 16 - Malik Mazhar Abbas Raan, Pakistani politician (b. 1953).
January 20 - Husain Mohammad Jafri, Pakistani historian.
January 25 - 
Fatima Ali, Pakistani-born American chef and reality show contestant (b. 1989).
Roohi Bano, Pakistani actress (b. 1951).
January 29 - Muhammad Arshad Khan Lodhi, Pakistani politician (b. 1937).

February
February 1 - Ehsan-ul-Haq Piracha, Pakistani politician.
February 2 - Arman Loni, Pakistani Pashto language poet and PTM leader (b. 1983)
February 13 - Baqar Naqvi, Pakistani Urdu poet and translator (b. 1936)
February 23 - Muhammad Tajammal Hussain, Pakistani politician (b. 1966)

March
March 1 - Jawaid Bhutto, philosopher
March 27 - John Permal, sprinter

April
April 1 - Sardar Fateh Buzdar, politician
April 18 - Jameel Jalibi, linguist, writer and academic administrator

May
May 4 - Ajmal Khan, botanist
May 11 - Abdul Rashid Puri, Scientist
May 16 - Jamil Naqsh, artist (b. 1939)
May 21 - Ali Mohammad Mahar, politician (b. 1967)

June
June 6 - Enver Sajjad, playwright (b. 1935)
June 10 - Akhtar Sarfraz, cricketer (b. 1976)
June 11 - Riazuddin (b. 1958)
June 23 - Abdul Sattar (b. 1931)

July

August

References 

 
Pakistan
Years of the 21st century in Pakistan
2010s in Pakistan
Pakistan